Attulus fasciger is a species of spider from the family Salticidae native to northern and western Asia but now introduced to North America.

Description
The sexes are similar in size but the  males have a small, but more slender abdomen compared to the female, with larger black palps.

Species history
The species, originally found throughout north and west Asia, is an introduced species in North America, first documented there in the 1950s or 1960s. Their success can be attributed to colonizing man-made structures, which provide refuge and camouflage for the mottled brown-and-grey spiders. This species also capitalizes on the artificial lighting found on many buildings, which attracts prey at night, thereby providing these visually-acute spiders with extended foraging opportunities.

References

External links

Sitticini
Spiders of Asia
Spiders described in 1880